Komondjari is one of the 45 provinces of Burkina Faso, located in its Est Region. Its capital (and only town) is Gayéri.

Departments
The province is divided into 3 departments.

References

 
Provinces of Burkina Faso